The University of Lahore, abbreviated as UOL, is a private university located in Lahore, Punjab, Pakistan. It was founded at collegiate level in 1999 under the IBADAT Educational Trust and was granted full degree awarding status in 2002. It is one of the largest private universities in Pakistan. Degrees are awarded in medicine, engineering, arts and social sciences. All programs are recognized by the Higher Education Commission (HEC) and government regulatory bodies in Pakistan. It is accredited by the Pakistan Engineering Council (PEC), Pakistan Bar Council, Pakistan Medical and Dental Council (PMDC), Pakistan Nursing Council and Pharmacy Council of Pakistan.University of lahore.

Introduction

The University of Lahore (UOL) has 2 campuses in Lahore, 2 campuses in Islamabad and one in Sargodha, Pakpattan and Gujrat. All programs run at the UOL, are recognized by the Higher Education Commission (HEC), the Government regulatory body, in Pakistan.The Lahore campus not only attracts locals in large number, but foreigners as well;thus providing rich diversity and fruitful environment.

The University also has courses accredited by the Pakistan Engineering Council (PEC), Pharmacy Council of Pakistan, Pakistan Bar Council and Pakistan Medical and Dental Council (PMDC) respectively.

The University has also achieved the highest W4 category ranking with the Higher Education Commission (HEC) of Pakistan. The University of Lahore is ranked at 801st position amongst the Top 1000 Universities of the World by QS-2018 Ranking, and at 251st position by Asian University Rankings-2017.  The University of Lahore has 7 campuses, 11 academic faculties, 35 academic departments, 3 technology parks, 2 research centres, Alumni network of 23000+, and 150+ degree programs and teaches 3,000+ courses. The Total Student Body in all campuses comes to around 36,000+ .

Faculties and departments

Faculty of Allied Health Sciences 
 Cardiac Perfusion Technology
 BS of Optometry 
 Dept. of Health Professional Technologies(HFT)
 Dept. of Sports Sciences
 Lahore School of Nursing
 Radiological Sciences & Medical Imaging Technology
 Dept. of Physiotherapy
 University Institute of Public Health
 Dept. of Diet & Nutritional Sciences
 Dept. of Clinical Lab Technology(CLT)

Faculty of Arts and Architecture
 School of Architecture
 School of Creative Arts

Faculty of Engineering and Technology
 Dept. of Civil Engineering
Dept. of Computer Engineering
 Dept. of Electrical Engineering
 Dept. of Mechanical Engineering
 Dept. of Electronics & Electrical Systems
 Dept. of Technology (Electrical, Mechanical, Civil)

Faculty of Information and Technology
 Dept. of Computer Science
 Dept. of Software Engg.

Faculty of Languages and Literature
 Dept. of English Language & Literature

Faculty of Medicine and Dentistry
 University College of Medicine
 University College of Dentistry
 University College of Physician
 University College of veterinary

Faculty of Management Sciences
Lahore School of Accounting & Finance
 Lahore Business School (LBS)
 Lahore School of Aviation (LSA) 
 Lahore School of Management & commerce

Faculty of Pharmacy
 Department of Pharmacy

Faculty of Sciences
 Institute Of Molecular Biology & Bio-Technology
 Dept. of Physics
 Dept. of Chemistry
 Dept. of Environment Sciences
 Dept. of Mathematics & Statistics

Faculty of Social Sciences
 Dept. of Education
 Dept. of Economics
 Dept. of Islamic Studies
 School of Integrated Social Sciences
 School of Accounting and Finance
 School of Grammar

QEC Learning Centre 
Learning Center of The University of Lahore is established for the professional development of the teaching faculty and staff.

Research journals

Pakistan Journal of Molecular Medicine (PJMM)
Pakistan Journal of Molecular Medicine (Pakistan J. Mol. Med.) is a semi-annual (6 monthly) journal, being published by the Institute of Molecular Biology and Biotechnology (IMBB), and Centre for Research in Molecular Medicine (CRiMM), The University of Lahore, Lahore, Pakistan. This Journal accepts the articles and reviews (invited and non-invited) in the disciplines of biochemistry, biotechnology, environmental sciences, forensic science, medicine, microbiology, molecular biology, pathology, pharmacology, physiology, toxicology and other Bio-medical sciences.

Journal of Media, Business and Social Sciences (JMBSS)
JMBSS is a specified, peer-reviewed and professional journal that is published bi-annually in both print and electronic forms by University of Lahore, Pakistan.

Asian Journal of Allied Health Sciences (AJAHS) 
We are living in information era and specialization with multidisciplinary orientation is playing its part greater than ever. To ensure originality of work and contribution to the knowledge. The Faculty of Allied Health Sciences (FAHS), The University of Lahore has published "Asian Journal of Allied Health Sciences (AJAHS)"; a Quarterly peer-reviewed open access Journal. The aim of the Journal is to provide a platform for allied health professionals to publish their research work. All materials, articles and information published in AJAHS will be peer-reviewed.

International students 
The University of Lahore has international students from different countries and has in recent years attracted students from Palestine, Sudan, Qatar, Yemen, Turkey, Nigeria, Syria, Somalia, Afghanistan, Nepal, Oman, Saudi Arabia, South Korea, Jordan, UAE and Uganda among others. Foreign seats are available in degree programmes such as Medicine, Dentistry, Engineering and English language and Literature.

University Advisory Board and other facilities
The Advisory Board consists of scientists, engineers and academicians who monitor the institute's standards of education and research. There are also career counsellors available to guide students in their studies and career choices. The UOL also publishes work in several scholastic journals affiliated to  Higher Education Commission (HEC) Pakistan. There are also international linkages with other universities.

Accommodation 
Separate hostel accommodation is available for both male and female students at The University of Lahore (UoL). The Defence Road Campus of the University features in facility of two hostels for females: Razia Hall and Fatima Hall, for about 1000 students in it. In order to facilitate the students, the following facilities have been provided at both the boys and girls hostels: Mess, mosque, separate television room, telephone, newspapers, guest rooms, Common Room, computer room, electric water coolers, high-speed Internet and Wi-fi, hostel laundry and 24-hour security.

The Islamabad Sihala Campus also provide the hostel facility to both male and female student with Wi-fi, hostel laundry and 24-7 Security.

Campuses 

The University of Lahore has Seven campuses across Pakistan that contains areas of:
 The University of Lahore (Main Campus) [4 acres 7 Kanal]
 The University of Lahore (Defence Road Campus) [24 acres / 192 kanal]
 The University of Lahore (City Campus) [1 Acre]
 The University of Lahore (Islamabad Campus) 20 Acre
 The University of Lahore (Sargodha Campus) [4 Acre]
 The University of Lahore (pakpattan Campus)
 The University of Lahore 
(Gujrat Campus)
 The University of Lahore 
(Uganda Campus)

Centers
The University have six research centers:
 Center For Research In Molecular Medicine (CRIMM)
 Radiology Research Section (RRS)
 Agri-Bio Technology Park
 Diagnostic Laboratory and Research Centre
 Postgraduate Computing Research Lab.
 Lahore Incubation Center  (LIC)

OPAC-UOL Library

The University's library resources include Books, Journal's and E-books. The University of Lahore currently houses four well equipped libraries with cumulatively more than 31000+ Books catering to a wide range of subjects. The University also has access to 72 Mbit/s Pakistan Educational Research Network (PERN) facilities, E- Library, OPAC, Mini labs, HEC Digital library as well as International online Libraries and Journals. The University of Lahore has subscription of World Class Turnitin services for Plagiarism check.

Green UOL 
UOL is setting up Off the Grid (OTG) Solar power generation plants and Bio-gas plants, a step forward against energy crisis that will provide green energy. This will enable the University to continue to provide excellent educational and research services to the nation in optimal circumstances.

The University of Lahore (UOL) has been placed at No. 3 ranking in Pakistan and No. 240 ranking internationally in "UI Green Metric Ranking 2016" based on the evaluation of these six main categories Green Statistics, Energy and Climate Change, Waste management, Water usage, Transportation, and Education.

UOL Rankings 
 QS World University Rankings (#1001-1200)
 Asia University Rankings (#301-350)
 Times Higher Education (#801)
 BRICS & Emerging Economies University Rankings (#251)
 University Web Rankings (#31) 
 UI Green Metric Ranking (#226)
 UOL Ranking among Pakistani Universities (#70)

References

2.  Admissions In The University Of Lahore Islamabad Campus University of the Lahore Admissions.

External links

 

 
Film schools in Pakistan
Educational institutions established in 1999
Private universities and colleges in Punjab, Pakistan
1999 establishments in Pakistan